Chambers Lodge may refer to:
Chambers Lodge, California
Redick Lodge, in Wyoming